The Auroras of Autumn is a 1950 book of poetry by Wallace Stevens. The book of poems contains the long poem of 10 cantos by Stevens of the same name.

Contents
The book features a collection of poems containing also the 1948 Stevens long poem of the same name, whose title refers to the Aurora Borealis, or the "Northern Lights", in the fall. The book collects 32 Stevens poems written between 1947 and 1950, and was his last collection before his 1954 Collected Poems.

The long poem in the book which is titled "The Auroras of Autumn" is a 240-line poem divided into ten cantos of 24 lines each. It is considered one of Stevens' more challenging and "difficult" works, and a 20th-century example of the English Romantic tradition. According to critic Harold Bloom, it is Stevens' only major poem "in which he allows himself to enter in his proper person, as a kind of dramatic figure." On this reading, the poem comes to an early climax at the end of canto VI, where Stevens describes a tension between his own imagination and a disintegrative and elusive reality, his subject:

{{poemquote|
On flames. The scholar of one candle sees
An Arctic effulgence flaring on the frame
Of everything he is. And he feels afraid. <ref>Wallace Stevens, The Collected Poems of Wallace Stevens."</ref>}}

Another notable poem in the book is The Owl in the Sarcophagus, an elegy for Stevens' best friend, Henry Church.

Awards
It won the 1951 National Book Award for Poetry.

 Notes 

 References 
 Beckett, Lucy. Wallace Stevens'' (Cambridge University Press, 1974).

External links 
 Review of The Auroras of Autumn in The New York Times (September 10, 1950)
Guest lecture  focusing on the poem The Auroras of Autumn (part of Open Yale Courses).

1950 poetry books
American poetry collections
Poetry by Wallace Stevens
Alfred A. Knopf books
National Book Award for Poetry winning works